Underrated Silence is the debut collaborative release by German electronic musician Ulrich Schnauss and Engineers' Mark Peters, released on 3 February 2012 through Bureau B.

Track listing

Personnel

Musicians
Ulrich Schnauss: Synthesizer, piano.
Mark Peters: Guitar, bass.
Judith Beck: Guitar on "Forgotten," vocals on "Long Distance Call" and "Forgotten".

Producers
Produced and mixed by Mark Peters and Ulrich Schnauss at home in York and London respectively.
Mastering by Tom Durack.

Other appearances
"Balcony Sunset" also appeared on the charity album for the Japan earthquake of 2011 For Nihon which was released on Helios' Keith Kenniff's label Unseen. The album featured acts such as Robin Guthrie and Harold Budd, Jon Hopkins, Ryuichi Sakamoto and Max Richter.

References

2012 debut albums
Ulrich Schnauss albums
Bureau B albums